FabricLive.47 is a 2009 album by Toddla T (Tom Bell). The album was released as part of the FabricLive Mix Series. Bell described the album as sounding as "Sheffield sonic stylee – as if a sweaty Sheffield basement was deported to Farringdon for the night."

Track listing
 Philly - Love Action - Philly
 Duffy - Stepping Stone (Cavemen Remix) - Universal/Polydor
 Monkey Steak - Tigris Riddim - Steak House
 Backyard Dog - Baddest Ruffest (Pipes & Slippers Mix) - WMI
 Toddla T ft Mr Versatile - Fill Up Mi Portion RMX (ft Afrikan Boy & Batty Rymer) - 1965/Sony
 Stone ft Roots Manuva - Amen - Stone Riddims
 3 Tracks Mixed:
 Toddla T ft Trigganom vs Clipz - Boom DJ from the Bristol City - 1965/Sony
 Toddla T - Boom DJ from the Steel City - 1965/Sony
 Clipz - Offline VIP - Audio Zoo
 Toddla T ft Serocee - Manbadman (Andy George Refix) - 1965/Sony
 4 Tracks Mixed:
 Toddla T ft Serocee - Shake It (Martelo Megashake) - 1965/Sony
 Fish Go Deep - The Cure and the Cause - Defected
 Geeneus & Zinc - Emotions (Geeneus Mix) - Rinse/Ammunition
 La Silva - Funky Flex - Lil Silva
 Shake Aletti - The Way he Does (Toddla T RMX ft Serocee) - Shake Aletti
 3 Tracks Mixed:
 Bart B More & Diplo vs Bashy - Millionaire Bingo - Bashy
 Bashy - Who Wants to be a Millionaire - Bashy
 Bingo Players - Get Up (Diplo Mix) - Secure
 Drums of Death - Lonely Days (DOD's Glasgow to Sheffield Nightbus Version) - Greco/Roman
 Alex Mills - Beyond Words (Wittyboy Remix) - Roll Deep
 Skream - Toddla T Special - Tempa/Ammunition
 3 Tracks Mixed:
 Toddla T ft Tinchy Stryder & Mr Versatile vs Untold - Anaconda Safe
 Toddla T - Safe - 1965/Sony
 Untold - Anaconda VIP - Hessle Audio
 3 Tracks Mixed:
 Busy Signal vs Pulse X - Tic Toc (J Needles Driver Blend)
 Busy Signal - TicToc - VP Music
 Youngsta - Pulse X - DDJS Productions
 Sticky ft Lady Chann - Sticky Situation - Unity
 Toddla T & Oneman ft Mr Versatile - Right Leg Shuffle - Girls Music
 Oris Jay - 4 Real - Oris Jay
 Toddla T ft Benjamin Zephaniah & Joe Goddard - Rebel (Skream Remix) - 1965/Sony
 Deadmau5 - I Remember (Caspa Remix) - Virgin

References

External links
Fabric: FabricLive.47

Toddla T albums
Fabric (club) albums
2009 compilation albums